January Wash, an arroyo, tributary to El Dorado Canyon, in Clark County, Nevada. Its mouth is located at its confluence with El Dorado Canyon at an elevation of 2375 feet.

References

Rivers of Clark County, Nevada
Washes of Nevada